Nina Pandolfo (born 1977) is a Brazilian street artist.

Life 
Nina Pandolfo was born in 1977 in Tupa, Sao Paulo. She started drawing and painting at the age of 3. At the age of 12, Nina Pandolfo started tagging public walls. She later became part of the group whose graffiti art featured in galleries and museums.

Work 
Using plastic, latex, and resin, Pandolfo makes use of a wide variety of  materials. Her work includes themes that draw from childhood and nature. She paints female subjects with wide-eyed, childish features in mysterious environments. Her characters evolve into more sophisticated forms with deeper more contemplative gazes.

One of Pandolfo's projects includes her partner work with Brazilian artists Os Gêmeos twins and Francisco Rodrigues da Silva (Nunca). In 2007, the four painted the facade and curtain of an 800 year old Kelburn Castle in Fairlie, North Ayrshire, in Scotland. The work is now a permanent feature of this historic building.

Pandolfo's most recent work, "Little Things for Life" is an exhibition and a gigantic mural featured on the Rivington Street Wall located in the lower east side in New York City. Her debut solo exhibition was held across the street at Rivington Street Gallery, Coburn Projects lower east side space. This new body of work is inspired by her perception of small details in everyday life.

Exhibitions 

2007: Beyond Street Art, Düsseldorf, Germany
2007: Wholetrain Project, Nordeste Tour: Recife, Natal and João Pessoa, Brazil
2008: Aos Nossos Olhos, Galeria Leme, São Paulo, Brazil
2008: Between Us, Gallery Maskara, Mumbai, India
2009: Queenz Arrive, McCaig-Welles Gallery, Brooklyn, NY
2009: Graffiti Gone Global, SushiSamba, Miami, FL
2009: The Wynwood Walls, Deitch Projects x Goldman Properties, Miami, FL
2010: Life’s Flavor, Carmichael Gallery, Los Angeles, CA
2012: Spice Angels, Lazarides, London
2015: Little things for life, Coburn Projects, New York City
2016: Beyond Meninas, Lazarides, London

References 

Brazilian graffiti artists
1997 births
Living people
People from Tupã, São Paulo